Eubule may refer to:
In Greek mythology (Εὐβούλη):
Eubule, one of the Danaïdes, betrothed to Demarchus
Eubule, one of the three daughters of Leos

Eubule, a personal name of which bearers include:
Eubule Thelwall (disambiguation)
Sir Eubule John Waddington, Governor of Northern Rhodesia (1941–1947)

Eubule (bug), a genus of bugs in the family Coreidae